Malaya genurostris is a species complex of zoophilic mosquito belonging to the genus Malaya. It is found in Sri Lanka, India, Malaya, Bangladesh, Cambodia, China, Myanmar, Taiwan, Thailand, Maldives, Indonesia, Nepal, Philippines, Singapore, Australia, and Irian Jaya.

References

External links
Malaya Leicester, 1908 - Mosquito Taxonomic Inventory

genurostris